The 2008 Italian motorcycle Grand Prix was the sixth round of the 2008 MotoGP championship. It took place on the weekend of 30 May-1 June 2008 at the Mugello Circuit. It marked Valentino Rossi's seventh consecutive victory at the Italian motorcycle Grand Prix, a run which was to be finally broken the following year by Casey Stoner.

MotoGP classification

250 cc classification

125 cc classification

Championship standings after the race (MotoGP)

Below are the standings for the top five riders and constructors after round six has concluded. 

Riders' Championship standings

Constructors' Championship standings

 Note: Only the top five positions are included for both sets of standings.

References

Italian motorcycle Grand Prix
Italian
Motorcycle Grand Prix